Yunnanodon ("Yunnan tooth", from China's Yunnan province where it was discovered, and the Greek odon (ὀδών) meaning "tooth") is an extinct genus of tritylodontid mammaliamorphs that lived in China during the Sinemurian stage of the Early Jurassic period. Its specific name brevirostre is Latin for "short-beaked" (brevis ("short") + rostrum ("beak")).

Yunnanodon was discovered in the Lower Lufeng Series, in Yunnan Province, China.  As a tritylodontid, it belongs to one of the few therapsid groups to survive the Triassic–Jurassic extinction event.  It was small, with adult skulls only reaching 36 to 47mm (1.4 to 1.8 inches) in length.

References

Tritylodontids
Prehistoric cynodont genera
Sinemurian genera
Early Jurassic synapsids
Jurassic synapsids of Asia
Jurassic China
Fossils of China
Fossil taxa described in 1986